You Don't Know Me or U Don't Know Me may refer to:

Music

Albums 
 You Don't Know Me (George Cables album), 2008
 You Don't Know Me (Thomas Chapin album), 1995
 You Don't Know Me: The Best of Armand Van Helden, 2008
 You Don't Know Me: Classic Country, by Crystal Gayle, 2019
 You Don't Know Me: The Songs of Cindy Walker, by Willie Nelson, 2006
 You Don't Know Me, by Mickey Gilley, 1981
 U Don't Know Me (EP), by Brandy, 1999

Songs 
 "You Don't Know Me" (Armand Van Helden song), 1999
 "You Don't Know Me" (Ben Folds song), 2008
 "You Don't Know Me" (Cindy Walker song), 1956; first recorded by Eddy Arnold, covered by several performers
 "You Don't Know Me" (Jax Jones song), 2016
 "U Don't Know Me" (Basement Jaxx song), 2005
 "U Don't Know Me" (T.I. song), 2005
 "U Don't Know Me (Like U Used To)", by Brandy, 1999
 "You Don't Know Me", by Apparat from Walls, 2007
 "You Don't Know Me", by Ariana Grande from My Everything, 2014
 "You Don't Know Me", by Autozamm, 2004
 "You Don't Know Me", by Caetano Veloso from Transa, 1972
 "You Don't Know Me", by Carole Bayer Sager from Sometimes Late at Night, 1981
 "You Don't Know Me", by Elizabeth Gillies from Victorious 3.0: Even More Music from the Hit TV Show, 2012
 "You Don't Know Me", by Gwen Stefani from This Is What the Truth Feels Like (non-album track), 2016
 "You Don't Know Me", by Jade Valerie from Out of the Box, 2007
 "You Don't Know Me", by Jay Sean from Me Against Myself, 2004
 "You Don't Know Me", by Meghan Trainor from Treat Myself, 2020
 "You Don't Know Me", by SOJA from Get Wiser
 "You Don't Know Me", by Son Lux from Bones, 2015
 "You Don't Know Me", by Tinashe from Nightride, 2016
 "You Don't Know Me", by Tracy Bonham from Down Here, 2000
 "U Don't Know Me", by Kid Rock from The Polyfuze Method, 1993

Other uses 
 You Don't Know Me (novel), a 2001 novel by David Klass
 You Don't Know Me, a 2017 novel by Imran Mahmood
 You Don't Know Me (TV series), a 2021 British series based on Imran Mahmood's novel
 "You Don't Know Me" (RuPaul's Drag Race), a television episode

See also
 You Don't Know (disambiguation)